Harvey Robert Brown  (born April 4, 1950) is a British philosopher of physics. He is a professor of philosophy at the University of Oxford and an emeritus fellow of Wolfson College, Oxford, as well as a fellow of the British Academy.

From 1978 to 1984, he was assistant professor at the University of São Paulo. In 1984 he became university lecturer in philosophy of physics at the University of Oxford, where he was promoted to reader in philosophy in 1996 and professor of philosophy of physics in 2006.

Selected works
1984. Albert Einstein. A simple man of vision, in Portuguese, Brasiliense, São Paulo.
1988. H.R. Brown and H.R. Harré (eds.). Philosophical Foundations of Quantum Field Theory, Oxford: Clarendon Press. Reprinted in paperback, 1990.
1991. S. Saunders and H.R. Brown (eds.). The Philosophy of Vacuum. Oxford: Clarendon Press.
1996. 'Mindful of quantum possibilities'. British Journal for the Philosophy of Science, 47: 189–200.
 
 1999. 'Aspects of objectivity in quantum mechanics'. In, J. Butterfield and C. Pagonis (eds.), From Physics to Philosophy. Cambridge: Cambridge University Press: 45–70.
 
 
2005. Physical Relativity. Space-time structure from a dynamical perspective. Oxford: Oxford University Press.

External links 

Philosophers of physics
1950 births
Living people
Fellows of the British Academy
Fellows of Wolfson College, Oxford
Academic staff of the University of São Paulo
Lakatos Award winners